The Gold Coast Cougars were the re-branded Daikyo Dolphins after major sponsor Daikyo had to end sponsorship of the team due to financial problems with the Australian arm of the company.

History

See also

Sport in Australia
Australian Baseball
Australian Baseball League (1989-1999)
Boston Red Sox - MLB affiliate

External links
The Australian Baseball League: 1989-1999

Australian Baseball League (1989–1999) teams
Defunct baseball teams in Australia
Sporting teams based on the Gold Coast, Queensland